Helstrom may refer to:

 Helstrom (TV series), an American television series, part of the Marvel Cinematic Universe
 Helstrom metric (or Bures metric), in quantum mechanics and mathematics, defining an infinitesimal distance between density matrix operators
 Echo Helstrom (band), a Portland, Oregon-based rock band

People with the surname
 Carl W. Helstrom (1925–2013), American electrical engineer and quantum information theory pioneer

See also
 Hellstrom (disambiguation)